Gautreaux, also Gautreau, is a surname of French origin. Notable people with the surname include:

 Butch Gautreaux (1947-2020), American politician
 Dorothy Gautreaux, litigant in the U.S. Supreme Court case Hills v. Gautreaux
 Pierre Gautreau, husband of Virginie Amélie Avegno Gautreau
 Sid Gautreaux, catcher for the Brooklyn Dodgers baseball team
 Tim Gautreaux, Southeastern Louisiana University professor and American novelist
 Virginie Amélie Avegno Gautreau, Louisiana-born Parisien socialite known as "Madame X" from a portrait painting by John Singer Sargent

See also
 Gautreaux Project